Kaljo Kiisk (3 December 1925 – 20 September 2007) was a Soviet and Estonian actor, film director, screenwriter and politician. He was best known for his roles as Kristjan Lible from Spring, Summer (Suvi) and Autumn (Sügis), film adaptations of Oskar Luts' novels, and as Johannes Saarepera from ETV's long-running Õnne 13. His career spanned over half a century from 1953 to 2007.

Early life
Kiisk was born and raised in Vaivina. In 1944, aged 18, he served in the anti-aircraft unit of the 20th Waffen Grenadier Division of the SS (1st Estonian), and took part in the Battle of Tannenberg Line. After World War II, he managed to obscure his military service from the Soviet occupiers. In 1946, he graduated from the Rakvere 1st Secondary School and enrolled at the Tallinn University of Technology. He switched the next year to the ESSR State Theatre Institute and in 1948, to the Russian Institute of Theatre Arts. Graduating in 1953, he returned to Estonia and joined the Estonian Drama Theatre.

Career

Stage, film and television
His first play was an adaptation of Oskar Luts' novel Spring, staged together with Kulno Süvalep in 1954, in which Kiisk played the part of the bright yet restless Joosep Toots. From 1955 to 1990, he worked as an actor and director at Tallinnfilm. His most notable works as a director included Naughty Curves (1959) and Dangerous Curves (1961), Madness (1969) and Nipernaadi (1983) He wrote the screenplay of the 1969 film Spring, an adaptation of Oskar Luts' popular novel, in which he also starred as Paunvere's bell-ringer Kristjan Lible. The film became an Estonian classic. From 1993 to 2007 (his death), he starred in Õnne 13 as Johannes Saarepera.

Politics
From 1980 to 1990, Kiisk was a member of the Supreme Soviet of the Estonian SSR and from 1989 to 1991, a member of the Congress of People's Deputies of the Soviet Union. In 1995 and 1999, he was elected to the Riigikogu as a member of the Estonian Reform Party.

Personal life
Kiisk married his classmate Zinaida Ivanova in 1947. They had a daughter, Riina, who married actor and poet Juhan Viiding. Poet Elo Viiding is his granddaughter.

Filmography

Film

Television

Honours
  Order of the White Star, 3rd Class
 PÖFF Lifetime Achievement Award

References

External links
 
 Kaljo Kiisk at the Estonian Film Database 

1925 births
2007 deaths
20th-century Estonian male actors
20th-century Estonian politicians
21st-century Estonian male actors
21st-century Estonian politicians
People from Toila Parish
Estonian Reform Party politicians
Members of the Central Committee of the Communist Party of Estonia
Members of the Riigikogu, 1995–1999
Members of the Riigikogu, 1999–2003
Members of the Supreme Soviet of the Estonian Soviet Socialist Republic, 1980–1985
Members of the Supreme Soviet of the Estonian Soviet Socialist Republic, 1985–1990
People's Artists of the Estonian Soviet Socialist Republic
Recipients of the Order of the Red Banner of Labour
Recipients of the Order of the White Star, 3rd Class
Estonian film directors
Estonian male film actors
Estonian male stage actors
Estonian screenwriters
Estonian theatre directors
Estonian Waffen-SS personnel
Soviet film directors
Soviet male film actors
Soviet male stage actors
Soviet screenwriters
Soviet theatre directors
Burials at Metsakalmistu